The women's synchronized trampoline competition in trampoline gymnastics at the 2001 World Games took place from 20 to 21 August 2001 at the Akita City Gymnasium in Akita, Japan.

Competition format
A total of 9 pairs entered the competition. Best eight duets from preliminary round qualifies to the final.

Results

Preliminary

Final

References

External links
 Results on IWGA website

Trampoline gymnastics at the 2001 World Games